How Nadya Went to Get Vodka is a 2020 Russian comedy film directed by Vladimir Mirzoyev. It was theatrically released in Russia on October 29, 2020.

Plot 
The film tells about two sisters who dream of finding a man and enter into competition until they find out that this man lives in a loveless marriage, as a result of which they decide to unite and return him to normal life.

Cast

References

External links 
 

2020 films
2020s Russian-language films
Russian comedy films
2020 comedy films